In Latin poetry Oestreminis ("Extreme West") was a name given to the territory of what is today modern Portugal and Galicia, comparable to Finis terrae, the "end of the earth" from a Mediterranean perspective. Its inhabitants were named Oestrimni from their location.

In Ora Maritima ("Seacoasts"), a poem inspired by a much earlier Greek mariners' periplus, Rufus Avienius Festus, Roman poet of the fourth century CE known for his pieces on geographical subjects, records that Oestriminis was peopled by the Oestrimni, a people who had lived there for a long time, and had to run away from their native lands after an invasion of serpents. His fanciful account has no archeological or historical application, but the poetical name has sometimes been ambitiously applied to popularized accounts of the Paleolithic inhabitants of Atlantic Iberia.

The expulsion of the Oestrimni,  from Ora Maritima:

The "serpent people" of the semi-mythical Ophiussa in the far west are noted in ancient Greek sources.

See also
Lusitania
Lusitanian mythology
History of Portugal
Timeline of Portuguese history
https://pt.wikipedia.org/wiki/Rio_Struma

Notes

External links
Ora Maritima (in Latin)
Culto a la serpiente en el mundo Antiguo Serpent cult in the Ancient Word (in Spanish)
Detailed map of the Pre-Roman Peoples of Iberia (around 200 BC)

Ancient Portugal
History of Galicia (Spain)